Carol Sánchez Cruz (born 16 April 1986) is a Costa Rican footballer who plays as a defender for Colombian club Independiente Santa Fe and the Costa Rica women's national football team. She competed at the 2015 FIFA Women's World Cup in Canada.

References

External links
 
 Profile  at Fedefutbol
 

1986 births
Living people
Women's association football defenders
Costa Rican women's footballers
People from Guanacaste Province
Costa Rica women's international footballers
2015 FIFA Women's World Cup players
Pan American Games bronze medalists for Costa Rica
Pan American Games medalists in football
Footballers at the 2019 Pan American Games
Footballers at the 2011 Pan American Games
Footballers at the 2015 Pan American Games
Central American Games gold medalists for Costa Rica
Central American Games medalists in football
VCU Rams women's soccer players
Costa Rican expatriate footballers
Costa Rican expatriate sportspeople in the United States
Expatriate women's soccer players in the United States
Costa Rican expatriate sportspeople in Colombia
Expatriate women's footballers in Colombia
Medalists at the 2019 Pan American Games